The magistrates' courts are the lowest level of the court system in South Africa. They are the courts of first instance for most criminal cases except for the most serious crimes, and for civil cases where the value of the claim is below a fixed monetary limit.

Divisions and districts
South Africa is divided into magisterial districts, each of which is served by a district magistrate's court and in some cases also branch courts or periodical courts. Districts are grouped together into regional divisions served by a regional court, which hears more serious cases. At present there is one regional division established for each province, and the regional court sits at multiple locations throughout the province.  there were 384 districts (and thus 384 district courts), 18 subdistricts with detached courts, 79 branch courts and 235 periodical courts. There were 1,914 magistrates including 351 regional court magistrates.

Jurisdiction
In criminal matters a district court has jurisdiction over all offences except treason, murder and rape, and a regional court has jurisdiction over all offences except treason. A district court can impose a fine of not more than R120,000 or a prison sentence of not more than three years, while a regional court can impose a fine of not more than R600,000 or a prison sentence of not more than 15 years, except that for certain offences a regional court can also impose a life sentence. In civil matters a district court has jurisdiction where the value of the claim is R200,000 or less, while a regional court has jurisdiction where the value of the claim is between R200,000 and R400,000. A regional court also has jurisdiction over divorce and related family law matters.

Cases in which no magistrate's court has jurisdiction must be brought before the High Court, which has the inherent jurisdiction to hear any case. The High Court also hears appeals from the magistrates' courts, and cases in which the constitutionality of any law or conduct of the President is brought into question.

List of magistrates' courts
The following towns are seats of magistracy, hosting a district magistrate's court or a detached court of a subdistrict. Regional courts for criminal cases may sit at any of these locations, but regional courts for civil cases sit only at those highlighted in bold text.

Eastern Cape

 Aberdeen
 Adelaide
 Alexandria
 Alice
 Aliwal North
 Barkly East
 Bedford
 Bizana
 Burgersdorp
 Butterworth
 Cala
 Cathcart
 Centane
 Cofimvaba
 Cradock
 Dordrecht
 Dutywa
 East London
 Elliot
 Elliotdale
 Flagstaff
 Fort Beaufort
 Graaff-Reinet
 Grahamstown
 Hankey
 Hofmeyr
 Humansdorp
 Indwe
 Jansenville
 Joubertina
 Keiskammahoek
 King William's Town
 Kirkwood
 Komga
 Lady Frere
 Lady Grey
 Libode
 Lusikisiki
 Maclear
 Maloti
 Mdantsane
 Middelburg
 Middledrift
 Molteno
 Motherwell
 Mount Ayliff
 Mount Fletcher
 Mount Frere
 Mqanduli
 Mthatha
 Ngcobo
 Ngqamakhwe
 Ngqeleni
 Ntabathemba
 Pearston
 Peddie
 Port Alfred
 Port Elizabeth
 Port St. Johns
 Queenstown
 Qumbu
 Seymour
 Somerset East
 Sterkspruit
 Sterkstroom
 Steynsburg
 Steytlerville
 Stutterheim
 Tabankulu
 Tarkastad
 Tsolo
 Tsomo
 Uitenhage
 Venterstad
 Whittlesea
 Willowmore
 Willowvale
 Zwelitsha

Free State

 Bethlehem
 Bethulie
 Bloemfontein
 Boshof
 Bothaville
 Botshabelo
 Brandfort
 Bultfontein
 Clocolan
 Dewetsdorp
 Edenburg
 Excelsior
 Fauresmith
 Ficksburg
 Fouriesburg
 Frankfort
 Harrismith
 Heilbron
 Hennenman
 Hoopstad
 Jacobsdal
 Jagersfontein
 Koffiefontein
 Koppies
 Kroonstad
 Ladybrand
 Lindley
 Makwane
 Marquard
 Odendaalsrus
 Parys
 Petrusburg
 Philippolis
 Phuthaditjhaba
 Reddersburg
 Reitz
 Rouxville
 Sasolburg
 Senekal
 Smithfield
 Thaba Nchu
 Theunissen
 Trompsburg
 Tseki
 Tsheseng
 Ventersburg
 Viljoenskroon
 Villiers
 Virginia
 Vrede
 Vredefort
 Welkom
 Wepener
 Wesselsbron
 Winburg
 Zastron

Gauteng

 Alberton
 Alexandra
 Benoni
 Boksburg
 Brakpan
 Bronkhorstspruit
 Cullinan
 Daveyton
Edenvale
 Ekangala
 Germiston
 Heidelberg
 Johannesburg
 Kempton Park
 Krugersdorp
 Mamelodi
 Meadowlands
 Nigel
 Oberholzer
 Pretoria
 Pretoria North
 Randburg
 Randfontein
 Roodepoort
 Soshanguve
 Springs
 Tembisa
 Vanderbijlpark
 Vereeniging
 Westonaria

KwaZulu-Natal

 Babanango
 Bergville
 Camperdown
 Chatsworth
 Dannhauser
 Dundee
 Durban
 Emlazi
 Empangeni
 Eshowe
 Estcourt
 Glencoe
 Greytown
 Harding
 Himeville
 Hlanganani
 Howick
 Impendle
 Ingwavuma
 Ixopo
 Kokstad
 Kranskop
 KwaDukuza
 Ladysmith
 Louwsburg
 Madadeni
 Mahlabatini
 Mapumulo
 Melmoth
 Mooi River
 Msinga
 Mtubatuba
 Mtunzini
 Ndwedwe
 New Hanover
 Newcastle
 Nkandla
 Nongoma
 Nqutu
 Ntuzuma
 Paulpietersburg
 Pietermaritzburg
 Pinetown
 Pongola
 Port Shepstone
 Richmond
 Scottburgh
 Ubombo
 Umbumbulu
 Umzimkulu
 Utrecht
 Verulam
 Vryheid
 Weenen

Limpopo

 Bela-Bela
 Dzanani
 Ga-Kgapane
 Giyani
 Groblersdal
 Lebowakgomo
 Lenyenye
 Lephalale
 Louis Trichardt
 Lulekani
 Mahwereleng
 Malamulele
 Mankweng
 Modimolle
 Mokopane
 Morebeng
 Musina
 Mutale
 Namakgale
 Nebo
 Nkowankowa
 Northam
 Phalaborwa
 Phalala
 Polokwane
 Praktiseer
 Sekhukhune
 Senwabarwana
 Seshego
 Thabazimbi
 Thohoyandou
 Tiyani
 Tshilwavhusiku
 Tshitale
 Tzaneen
 Vuwani
 Waterval

Mpumalanga

 Amersfoort
 Balfour
 Barberton
 Bethal
 Bushbuckridge
 Carolina
 Delmas
 Eerstehoek
 eMakhazeni
 eMalahleni
 Emgwenya
 Ermelo
 Evander
 Ga-Nala
 Kabokweni
 KwaMhlanga
 Mashishing
 Mbibana
 Mbombela
 Mdutjana
 Middelburg
 Mkobola
 Moutse
 Piet Retief
 Sabie
 Standerton
 Thulamahashe
 Tonga
 Volksrust
 Wakkerstroom
 White River

North West

 Bloemhof
 Brits
 Christiana
 Coligny
 Delareyville
 Ganyesa
 Ga-Rankuwa
 Itsoseng
 Klerksdorp
 Koster
 Lehurutshe
 Lichtenburg
 Madikwe
 Mmabatho
 Mogwase
 Mothibistad
 Phokeng
 Potchefstroom
 Rustenburg
 Schweizer-Reneke
 Swartruggens
 Taung
 Temba
 Ventersdorp
 Vryburg
 Wolmaransstad
 Zeerust

Northern Cape

 Barkly West
 Britstown
 Calvinia
 Carnarvon
 Colesberg
 De Aar
 Douglas
 Fraserburg
 Griekwastad
 Groblershoop
 Hanover
 Hartswater
 Hopetown
 Jan Kempdorp
 Kakamas
 Kathu
 Keimoes
 Kenhardt
 Kimberley
 Kuruman
 Noupoort
 Philipstown
 Pofadder
 Postmasburg
 Prieska
 Richmond
 Springbok
 Sutherland
 Upington
 Victoria West
 Warrenton
 Williston

Western Cape

 Atlantis
 Beaufort West
 Bellville
 Bredasdorp
 Caledon
 Calitzdorp
 Cape Town
 Ceres
 Clanwilliam
 George
 Goodwood
 Heidelberg
 Hermanus
 Hopefield
 Khayelitsha
 Knysna
 Kuils River
 Ladismith
 Laingsburg
 Malmesbury
 Mitchell's Plain
 Montagu
 Moorreesburg
 Mossel Bay
 Murraysburg
 Oudtshoorn
 Paarl
 Piketberg
 Prince Albert
 Riversdale
 Robertson
 Simon's Town
 Somerset West
 Stellenbosch
 Strand
 Swellendam
 Tulbagh
 Uniondale
 Vanrhynsdorp
 Vredenburg
 Vredendal
 Wellington
 Worcester
 Wynberg

See also
 Courts of South Africa

References

Courts of South Africa